The Criminal Justice Act 1991 (c. 53) is an Act of the Parliament of the United Kingdom. Most of it only applies to England and Wales, with certain clauses extended to either Northern Ireland or Scotland. The Act enabled the introduction of private prisons to the United Kingdom, attempted to reform the system of fines in England and Wales, established HM Inspectorate of Probation as a statutory body, and allowed for the Home Secretary to release foreign prisoners from prison to enable their deportation.

It remains in force with many of its provisions amended by subsequent Criminal Justice Acts.

History 
The Conservative MP John Greenway attempted to have the Act amended during its passage to introduce the death penalty for the murder of a police officer.

Provisions

Early Removal Scheme 
The Act mode provision for an Early Removal Scheme. Under the Scheme, the Home Secretary can release foreign national prisoners early from prison where they were subject to deportation or administrative removal. The Scheme is currently regulated by the Criminal Justice Act 2003 and was modified in 2008 by Statutory Instrument to reduce the qualifying period before a prisoner could be released for deportation.

Unit fines 
Section 18 made provision for fines to be imposed using a mathematical formula that took into account the seriousness of the crime and the offenders ability to pay. This was subject to criticism from magistrates and others for imposing significant fines on wealthier individuals for minor offences, and insignificant fines on poorer individuals for more serious offences. Eventually, Kenneth Clarke introduced the Criminal Justice Act 1993 to remove the system of unit fines.

Drug rehabilitation 
Schedule 1A6 made provision for attendance at drug treatment for an offender on probation who suffered from alcohol or drug dependence.

HM Inspectorate of Probation 
Section 73 placed HM Inspectorate of Probation on a statutory footing.

Private prisons 
Sections 84 to 88 made it possible for the establishment of private prisons in England and Wales. Subsequently, HM Prison Wolds opened as the first privately managed prison in the UK in 1992.

References

Criminal law of the United Kingdom
United Kingdom Acts of Parliament 1991